David Banks (born September 2, 1965), known by his stage name DJ Disciple, is an American DJ and house music producer from Brooklyn, New York. For much of his early career, he worked in London and was influential in the rise of UK garage music. Stateside, he was considered a cornerstone of New York City's house music scene.

Early life
Banks was born in Brooklyn, New York in 1965, the youngest of four brothers. His father, a World War II veteran, played piano with Miles Davis and his brother Stanley played bass with George Benson. Another brother, Larry, is also a musician. Banks grew up in the Farragut Projects and attended the Greater Refuge Temple in Harlem, where he played drums. Neighbors of the family included Strafe and Shannon's bass player Rusty Taylor, Grandmaster Flowers, Jocelyn Brown, Puffy Combs, and Mary J. Blige were friends and colleagues of Banks' brothers.  He graduated from Franklin Delano Roosevelt High School in 1984 and attended Baruch College to study accounting. He later switched to studying journalism.

Career
In college, Banks worked at Baruch's college radio stations. He was originally a gospel DJ and chose his name as a reminder that "only what you do for Christ shall last." In 1987, he began working as a radio host and mixer for WNYE (FM), where he hosted The Best Kept Secret. He gained a reputation for debuting music before its official release date. Among that music were the songs "Follow Me" (1992) by Aly-Us and "Beautiful People" (1994) by Barbara Tucker; he also aired music by Todd Terry, Louie Vega, Roger Sanchez, and Todd Edwards. In 1995, he released a remix of Plutonic's "Addicted"; the mix was not commercially available until 2001. His show was also unusual in that he played dance music by female DJs.

His first professional DJ gig was at Studio 54, followed by his first nightclub gig at The World in 1989. He then became the resident DJ of Wild Pitch and learned from DJs such as Larry Levan and DJ Basil. He also played at the Choice in Lower Manhattan. Banks was hired several times by two Phi Beta Sigma brothers to DJ their Hunter College parties, where Banks, with the help of duo Slick & Smooth Productions, caught the attention of Leonard Gabbidon and Stan Dennis. Gabbidon subsequently hired him to close shows for Jomanda, Liz Torres, Main Source, Special Ed, Run DMC, and Brand Nubian at the Syracuse Greekfest in 1989-1991. Dennis hired him to play at the Jones Beach Greekfest, while other fraternity brothers recommended him for parties at St. John's University and The City College.

In 1990, he worked as the Friday night resident DJ at Club 280 in New Jersey, then at Club Zanzibar following Tony Humphries' departure. The Best Kept Secret's popularity got him a spot as a regular mixer for Japan's Bay FM. With connections made through Roger Sanchez and his mentor DJ Camacho, Banks began to tour in the early 1990s. He played widely in the United Kingdom at clubs and venues including Lakota, Ministry of Sound, Notting Hill Carnival, Southport Weekender (1995-1997), Cream, and The Zap, among others. Between 1993 and 2001, he played at Ministry of Sound at least twice a year;  three times a year (1994-2004) at To The Manor Born in Sedgefield; and annually (1994-2010) at Notting Hill Carnival.  Across the pond, he appeared at Sona in Montréal twice a year between 1998-2004. He played on Kiss FM London's The Zoo Experience twice a year between 1993 and 2003.

DJ Magazine included Banks on their list of Top 100 DJs worldwide in 1993 and did his first featured interview the following year. He debuted his first single, "When the Music Stops," on Muzik Pushers in 1993. The song quickly became a club hit in Italy and was picked up by D:vision Records. He performed at the Angels of Love club in Naples, Italy that same year. Banks produced The Street Experience EP; three of its songs stood out in particular. "On the Dancefloor" hit the UK singles charts at #67. "Steal Away" was included by Erick Morillo in a Ministry of Sound compilation and "Burning" was licensed to Deconstructed Records in the UK. Meanwhile, the Hard Times club in Leeds established a label in 1994. One of their first releases was Banks remixing Robert Owens and Michael Watford performing "Come Together". The first hit for Banks' own label, Catch 22 Recordings, was "Put Your Hands Up" (1998) by the Black & White Brothers, which he mixed; it sold four million copies.

Banks left WNYE in 1997 to host the Transatlantic Mix on KISS 100 in London with Tony Walker, which was a successful venture.  Upon returning to the United States, Banks was variously the resident DJ at the Rumpus Room, Flo Lounge, Baroque, Great British House, Spy Bar, Quo, and Lesouk. In 2001, he began writing about his experiences on the website Trust the DJ, which eventually gave way to his book Around the World in 150 Clubs, which detailed notable clubs he had played around the world. In 2008, he started Next Level Party in Brooklyn and made a YouTube documentary series about his shows. In March 2015, Banks released the album My House Music Story, a best of album, and marked thirty years as a DJ that September. In October 2016, he became the music programmer for Martha's Country Bakery in the Williamsburg neighborhood of Brooklyn. In 2017, his label, Catch 22, celebrated its 20-year anniversary.

On June 15, 2023, The Beat, the Scene, the Sound: A DJ's Journey through the Rise, Fall, and Rebirth of House Music in New York City, a book written by Banks and journalist Henry Kronk, is scheduled to be released by Rowman & Littlefield. It covers club and street culture between the demise of disco and the rise of EDM.

Collaborations and remixes
Among the many songs Banks has remixed are "Love's Here at Last" by Judy Albanese (1997), "Addicted" by Plutonic (1998),"Yes" by Suzy (2002), and "Always Come Back to Your Love" by Samantha Mumba. His remix of Love Tattoo's "The Bass Has Got Me Movin'" (2001) earned him an ARIA Music Award and a Grammy nomination. Songs he has produced include "Wannabe" by Taka Boom (2000), "My Sweet Self" by AMORELLE, "Romper Room" by Dru Hepkins (2009), "Here Comes the Morning" (2004) by Barbara Walker; and "Fantasy/Reality" by Cyn.  In 2000, My True Colors was released on Catch 22 and was the first full-length album that Banks had produced.

Artists he has collaborated with include Albert Neve, Collette Mclaffery, Javi Mula, Jan & Solo, Steve Mac as part of Nympho Soundz, Michele Chiavarini as part of D & M Project and Brooklyn Soul Boys, Guida de Palma, Jeremy Sylvester as part of X-Factor-7, Gerald Elms, and Lady Bunny. Grant Nelson engineered two of the tracks on one of Banks' EPs, later released by Todd Terry's record label Freeze; in return, Banks did vocals for Nelson's debut with Swing City Records. "To the Bone" is the first single in which Banks' radio voice was used in a recording. Terry sampled this for his song "Latin Love (Rip Off Mix)" which gave Banks more exposure. The record was recalled, however, because of the controversial sample. 

His song "You" was remixed by Roger Sanchez in 2001 and "Keep It Up" was a collaboration with Robbie Rivera. He released "No One Knows" in 2001 under the name Banji Boyz. The record's B-side, "Free Florida," also saw commercial success and hit the charts in the Netherlands. Altra Moda Music re-released the record in 2012 with DJ Dannic remixes. His 2002 single "Caught Up" hit #1 on the US Billboard Hot Dance Club Play Chart, got nominated for a Grammy that November, and appeared on the Queer as Folk soundtrack. The song "Changes" was a collaboration with David Tort and DJ Ruff and appeared on the Beatport digital top three downloads for two months. In 2006, he released "Work It Out" featuring Dawn Tallman on the Catch 22 label. It topped dance club charts, including Buzz and Cool Cuts, making it a commercial success. and was re-released by Klaas for House Trained Records in 2008 with remixes. It was played on BBC Radio 1 by Pete Tong and its music video marked Banks' debut on MTV. The video for "Sexy Lady", which he produced with Javi Mula, received The Best 'Dance ClipVideo' in Spain. In 2008, he and David Tort collaborated on the song "Rise Up", which appeared on the Máxima FM playlist. That March, he was nominated for Beatport Best House Artist and played at the Winter Music Conference BBC Radio 1 Pool Party in Miami. In 2011, Pioneer Electronics approached him to write a promotional song for their new portable player, the Steez, resulting in the song "U Know My Steez."

Personal life
Brooks married Amber Daniels in 2011. They have one daughter, Julia, and divorced in 2016. Banks participates annually in DJs Against Hunger, a concert where canned goods could be donated at the door and proceeds are donated to Brooklyn Community Housing and Services. He also took part in a drive to benefit victims of Hurricane Sandy in 2012.

Selected discography

Singles and EPs
 1993: "When The Music Stops" (D:vision Records)
 1994: "On The Dancefloor" (Mother Records)
 1994: "The Soul Party Project" (Grassroots Records)
 1995: "I'll Do Anything" - D.J. Disciple Presents Innervisions Feat. Dawn Tallman (Smack)
 1995: Street Experience (Volume #2) (Muzik Pushers)
 1997: The 12 Steps 2 Heaven E.P. (Narcotic Records)
 1998: "Takin' It Back" - RIP* Feat DJ Disciple (In' Sync)
 1999: "Wannabe" - Taka Boom (Catch 22 Recordings)
 2000: "It's Easy" (Azuli Records)
 2002: "Fantasy Reality" - Cyn
 2002: "Super Drum" - Robbie Rivera Feat. DJ Disciple (Azuli Records)
 2002: "Yes" (Catch 22 Recordings)
 2003: "Satisfied" (Catch 22 Recordings)
 2004: The NYC Sampler Sessions (Catch 22 Recordings)
 2005: "I Get High" (Catch 22 Recordings)
 2006: "Deep Underground / Crossroads" - DJ Disciple Meets David Tort & DJ Ruff (Catch 22 Recordings)
 2006: "Work It Out" Feat. Dawn Tallman (Catch 22 Recordings)
 2007: "Changes" - David Tort & Ruff* Meet DJ Disciple (Vendetta Records)
 2009: "Big Beautiful Women (Watch Out For The Big Girls)"
 2009: "When I Die" - DJ Disciple & Dru Hepkins (Net's Work International)
 2010: "Can You Handle This" - Emily Angel and DJ Disciple
 2010: "Sexy Lady" - Javi Mula Feat. DJ Disciple
 2011: "Jasmin Garden" - Stefan Vilijn And DJ Disciple
 2011: "Whole World Party" Feat. Dawn Tallman
 2012: "Drop It Down" Feat. Tyra Juliette
 2012: "It's Your Night (Let The Beat Rock)" - D.E.M Feat. DJ Disciple & Dru Hepkins
 2012: "Romper Room" - Albert Neve Feat. DJ Disciple, Dru Hepkins & Norykko
 2012: "U Know My Steez" - Jan & Solo Feat. DJ Disciple

DJ Mixes
 1996: Freeze Club Mixer Volume 6: DJ Disciple Megamix '96 (CD, Comp, Mixed) (Freeze Records)
 1998: Maxi Records Presents House Disciples - A DJ Disciple Mix (CD, Comp, Mixed) (Maxi Records)
 1999: New York City 100% Dance Volume 2 International House Vibes (CD, Comp, Mixed) (Master Dance Tones UK)
 2000: Selections (CD, Comp, Mixed) (Northcott Productions Ltd.)
 2001: Trust The DJ - DJ Disciple Volume 1
 2004: Uploaded Volume 1 (Seamless Recordings)
 2005: Various, Red Lite Series 2
 2009: Addicted To DJ Disciple And Baggi Begovic

External links
 
 
 DeepHousePage.com forum with DJ Disciple's WNYE radio mixes from the 1990s

References

African-American DJs
American house musicians
American dance musicians
Club DJs
DJs from New York City
Electronic dance music DJs
Remixers
Living people
21st-century African-American people
1965 births
Baruch College alumni